|}

The Istabraq Hurdle is a Grade 3 National Hunt hurdle race in Ireland which is open to horses aged four years or older. It is run at Tipperary Racecourse over a distance of about 2 miles (3,219 metres), and it is scheduled to take place each year in early October.

The race was first run in 1997 and prior to 2006 was known as the John James McManus Memorial Hurdle.  From 2007 to 2013 it was run as the Tipperary Hurdle. Since the 2018 running the race has been sponsored by the Horse & Jockey Hotel. It now takes place at a meeting which features both jump and flat races, and it is held on the same afternoon as the Concorde Stakes.

Records
Most successful horse (3 wins):
 Istabraq – 1997,1998,1999

Leading jockey (5 wins):
 Mark Walsh – Captain Cee Bee (2011,2012), Plinth (2015), Jezki (2017), Saint Roi (2020)

Leading trainer (4 wins):
 Aidan O'Brien – Istabraq (1997,1998,1999), Plinth (2015)

Winners

See also
 Horse racing in Ireland
 List of Irish National Hunt races

References
 Racing Post:

National Hunt races in Ireland
National Hunt hurdle races
Tipperary Racecourse